North Sipore is a district of Mentawai Islands Regency in Indonesia. It is located on the northern portion of the Sipore Island. The seat of the regency is located in Tuapejat, on the northern tip of the district. With just over 12,000 inhabitants on 2015, it is the most populated district in the regency.

The district is subdivided into 5 villages and a kelurahan:
Betumonga
Goiso Oinan
Bukit Pamewa
Sipora Jaya
Sidomakmur
Tuapejat (kelurahan, regency and district seat)

References

Populated places in West Sumatra
Districts of West Sumatra